is a Japanese traditional architectural structure where the building has its main entrance on one or both of the . The kasuga-zukuri, taisha-zukuri, and sumiyoshi-zukuri Shinto architectural styles all belong to this type.

References

Shinto shrines
Architecture in Japan

ja:切妻造#平入り・妻入り